The Santiam River  is a tributary of the Willamette River, about  long, in western Oregon in the United States.  Through its two principal tributaries, the North Santiam and the South Santiam rivers, it drains a large area of the Cascade Range at the eastern side of the Willamette Valley east of Salem and Corvallis.

Watershed

Both the North and South Santiam rise in high Cascades in eastern Linn County. The Middle Santiam River joins the South Santiam where the South Santiam is impounded to form Foster Lake. The Santiam is a major source of water supply for Salem.

History
The land surrounding Santiam river is the historic homeland of the Santiam band of the Kalapuya. Chief Alaquema (aka Joe Hutchins) of the Santiam negotiated with U.S. representative John Gain at the Santiam Treaty Council in 1851 before the forced removal of the Santiam and other Kalapuya tribes to the Grande Ronde reservation. After days of arguing, Alaquema told Gain, "We understand fully what you mean and that it may be better for us, but our minds are made up." He pointed to the land between the fork of the river on a map and said, "We wish to reserve this piece of land. We do not wish to leave this. We would rather be shot on it than removed." This treaty was however never ratified and in 1856 the Santiam were later forced to leave the fork in the Santiam River they had fought to preserve.

The Great Willamette Flood of 1861, which crested on December 2, destroyed many structures and animals on prairies near its confluence with the Willamette River and south of Knox Butte.

Fire district
Santiam River Zone is staffed by the Santiam Type 2 initial attack hand crew and two engines based out of the Detroit Ranger District. Additionally the Willamette National Forest has fire crews on the Mckenzie and Middle Fork Ranger Districts.

See also
 List of Oregon rivers
 Willamette Riverkeeper

Footnotes

References

External links
 
 
 

Rivers of Oregon
Rivers of Marion County, Oregon
Rivers of Linn County, Oregon
Tributaries of the Willamette River
Kalapuya
Oregon placenames of Native American origin